Nicky Law may refer to:

Nicky Law (footballer, born 1961)
Nicky Law (footballer, born 1988)